In chemistry, an ideal solution or ideal mixture is a solution that exhibits thermodynamic properties analogous to those of a mixture of ideal gases. The enthalpy of mixing is zero as is the volume change on mixing by definition; the closer to zero the enthalpy of mixing is, the more "ideal" the behavior of the solution becomes. The vapor pressures of the solvent and solute obey Raoult's law and Henry's law, respectively, and the activity coefficient (which measures deviation from ideality) is equal to one for each component.

The concept of an ideal solution is fundamental to chemical thermodynamics and its applications, such as the explanation of colligative properties.

Physical origin 

Ideality of solutions is analogous to ideality for gases, with the important difference that intermolecular interactions in liquids are strong and cannot simply be neglected as they can for ideal gases.  Instead we assume that the mean strength of the interactions are the same between all the molecules of the solution.

More formally, for a mix of molecules of A and B, then the interactions between unlike neighbors (UAB) and like neighbors UAA and UBB  must be of the same average strength, i.e., 2 UAB = UAA + UBB and the longer-range interactions must be nil (or at least indistinguishable).  If the molecular forces are the same between AA, AB and BB, i.e., UAB = UAA = UBB, then the solution is automatically ideal.

If the molecules are almost identical chemically, e.g., 1-butanol and 2-butanol, then the solution will be almost ideal.  Since the interaction energies between A and B are almost equal, it follows that there is only a very small overall energy (enthalpy) change when the substances are mixed.  The more dissimilar the nature of A and B, the more strongly the solution is expected to deviate from ideality.

Formal definition 
Different related definitions of an ideal solution have been proposed. The simplest definition is that an ideal solution is a solution for which each component obeys Raoult's law  for all compositions.

This definition depends on vapor pressure, which is a directly measurable property, at least for volatile components. The thermodynamic properties may then be obtained from the chemical potential μ (which is the partial molar Gibbs energy g) of each component. If the vapor is an ideal gas, 

The reference pressure  may be taken as  = 1 bar, or as the pressure of the mix, whichever is simpler.

This equation for the chemical potential can be used as an alternate definition for an ideal solution.

However, the vapor above the solution may not actually behave as a mixture of ideal gases. Some authors therefore define an ideal solution as one for which each component obeys the fugacity analogue of Raoult's law  . Since the fugacity is defined by the equation 

this definition leads to ideal values of the chemical potential and other thermodynamic properties even when the component vapors above the solution are not ideal gases. An equivalent statement uses thermodynamic activity instead of fugacity.

Thermodynamic properties

Volume 

Since we know from the Gibbs potential equation that:

with the molar volume , these last two equations put together give:

Applying the first equation of this section to this last equation we find: 

which means that the partial molar volumes in an ideal mix are independent of composition. Consequently, the total volume is the sum of the volumes of the components in their pure forms:

Enthalpy and heat capacity 
Proceeding in a similar way but taking the derivative with respect to  we get a similar result for molar enthalpies:

Remembering that  we get:

which in turn means that  and that the enthalpy of the mix is equal to the sum of its component enthalpies.

It is also easily verifiable that

Entropy of mixing 
Finally since 

we find that 

Since the Gibbs free energy per mole of the mixture  is

then

At last we can calculate the molar entropy of mixing since 
 and

Consequences 
Solvent–solute interactions are the same as solute–solute and solvent–solvent interactions, on average. Consequently, the enthalpy of mixing (solution) is zero and the change in Gibbs free energy on mixing is determined solely by the entropy of mixing. Hence the molar Gibbs free energy of mixing is

or for a two-component ideal solution 

Note that this free energy of mixing is always negative (since each , each  or its limit for  must be negative (infinite)), i.e., ideal solutions are miscible at any composition and no phase separation will occur.

The equation above can be expressed in terms of chemical potentials of the individual components

Any component  of an ideal solution obeys Raoult's Law over the entire composition range:

where  is the equilibrium vapor pressure of pure component  and is the mole fraction of component  in solution.

Non-ideality 

Deviations from ideality can be described by the use of Margules functions or activity coefficients.  A single Margules parameter may be sufficient to describe the properties of the solution if the deviations from ideality  are modest; such solutions are termed regular. 

In contrast to ideal solutions, where volumes are strictly additive and mixing is always complete, the volume of a non-ideal solution is not, in general, the simple sum of the volumes of the component pure liquids and solubility is not guaranteed over the whole composition range. By measurement of densities, thermodynamic activity of components can be determined.

See also 

 Activity coefficient
 Entropy of mixing
 Margules function
 Regular solution
 Coil-globule transition
 Apparent molar property
 Dilution equation
 Virial coefficient

References 

Solutions
Thermodynamics
Chemical thermodynamics